Gary William Green (20 November 1950 in Stroud Green, North London, England) is an English musician. During the 1970s, he was the guitarist for the progressive rock band Gentle Giant. Green was with the band from the debut album Gentle Giant all the way to the last album Civilian. Green's style was different from most of his peers, being a more blues-based guitarist. Like his fellow band members, Green was also adept at other instruments, including mandolin and recorder. According to a 2008 interview, founding member Phil Shulman said that, despite Green's blues influences, he fit in well with the band's progressive style since Green was "quick on the up-take."

Later on, he was a member of the band Mother Tongue, and also recorded on The Green Album with Eddie Jobson and Zinc, splitting guitar duties with Zinc guitarist Michael Cuneo on two tracks. Green has worked with Billy Sherwood on a number of projects, including Back Against The Wall (2005) and Return to the Dark Side of the Moon (2006). He is now a member of a band called Three Friends with fellow Gentle Giant member Malcolm Mortimore.

Green lives in Princeton, Illinois, United States, with his wife, Judy.

Gary Green's brother, Jeff Green, was a roadie for Soft Machine in the early 1970s and later played with Elton Dean.

References

English rock guitarists
1950 births
Progressive rock guitarists
Living people
English expatriates in the United States
Gentle Giant members